In mathematics, and especially complex geometry, the holomorphic tangent bundle of a complex manifold  is the holomorphic analogue of the tangent bundle of a smooth manifold. The fibre of the holomorphic tangent bundle over a point is the holomorphic tangent space, which is the tangent space of the underlying smooth manifold, given the structure of a complex vector space via the almost complex structure  of the complex manifold .

Definition
The integrable almost complex structure  corresponding to the complex structure on the manifold  is an endomorphism  with the property that .

Since ,  has eigenvalues  on the complexified tangent bundle, and  therefore splits as a direct sum

where  is the -eigenbundle, and  the -eigenbundle.

The holomorphic cotangent bundle is the dual of the holomorphic tangent bundle, and is written . Similarly the anti-holomorphic cotangent bundle is the dual of the anti-holomorphic tangent bundle, and is written . The holomorphic and anti-holomorphic (co)tangent bundles are interchanged by conjugation, which gives a real-linear (but not complex linear!) isomorphism .

The holomorphic tangent bundle  is isomorphic as a real vector bundle of rank  to the regular tangent bundle . The isomorphism is given by the composition  of inclusion into the complexified tangent bundle, and then projection onto the -eigenbundle.

Alternative local description
Dual to these complex-valued one-forms are the complex-valued vector fields (that is, sections of the complexified tangent bundle),

As such, these vector fields also split the complexified tangent bundle into two subbundles

This is precisely the splitting into the holomorphic and anti-holomorphic tangent bundles previously described. Similarly the complex-valued one-forms  and  provide the splitting of the complexified cotangent bundle into the holomorphic and anti-holomorphic cotangent bundles.

From this perspective, the name holomorphic tangent bundle becomes transparent. Explicitly, if we have two charts  with two sets of coordinates , then 

Since the coordinate functions are holomorphic, so are any derivatives of them, and so the transition functions of the holomorphic tangent bundle are also holomorphic. Thus the holomorphic tangent bundle is a genuine holomorphic vector bundle. Similarly the holomorphic cotangent bundle is a genuine holomorphic vector bundle, with transition functions given by the inverse transpose of the Jacobian matrix. Notice that the anti-holomorphic tangent and cotangent bundles do not have holomorphic transition functions, but anti-holomorphic ones.

In terms of the local frames described, the almost-complex structure  acts by

or in real coordinates by

Holomorphic vector fields and differential forms
Since the holomorphic tangent and cotangent bundles have the structure of holomorphic vector bundles, there are distinguished holomorphic sections. For more details see complex differential forms.

See also
Almost complex manifold
Hermitian manifold

References

 

Complex manifolds